Yai Nilwong (born 12 March 1985) is a Thai professional footballer who currently coach and player for Dragon Pathumwan Kanchanaburi in Thai League 3.

Personal life

Yai's brother Sompob Nilwong is also a footballer and plays as a center back.

Honours

Club
Thai Port 
 Thai League Cup (1): 2010

Dragon Pathumwan Kanchanaburi
Thai League 3 Western Region (1): 2022–23

References

External links
 Yai Nilwong at Goal

1985 births
Living people
Yai Nilwong
Yai Nilwong
Association football wingers
Yai Nilwong
Yai Nilwong
Yai Nilwong
Yai Nilwong
Yai Nilwong
Yai Nilwong
Yai Nilwong
Yai Nilwong